The Youthful Days of Frederick the Great is an 1817 stage melodrama by the British writer and actor William Abbot. It premiered at the Theatre Royal, Covent Garden in London on 2 October 1817.  The cast included Daniel Terry as Frederick William, King of Prussia, Abbot as The Prince Royal, Daniel Egerton as Baron Kniphausen, Chapman as Count Seckendoff, Charles Connor as Anhalt, Charles Farley as Frederstoff and Harriet Faucit as Christine.

Synopsis
Growing up in a Potsdam ruled by his domineering father Frederick William of Prussia, the young Prince and future Frederick the Great plans to flee the country in protest at his father's plan for an arranged marriage with a woman he has never met.

References

Bibliography
 Greene, John C. Theatre in Dublin, 1745-1820: A Calendar of Performances, Volume 6. Lexington Books, 2011.
 Nicoll, Allardyce. A History of Early Nineteenth Century Drama 1800-1850. Cambridge University Press, 1930.

1817 plays
West End plays
British plays
Plays set in Germany
Historical plays
Plays set in the 18th century